The citron (Citrus medica), historically cedrate, is a large fragrant citrus fruit with a thick rind. It is said to resemble a 'huge, rough lemon'. It is one of the original citrus fruits from which all other citrus types developed through natural hybrid speciation or artificial hybridization. Though citron cultivars take on a wide variety of physical forms, they are all closely related genetically. It is used in Asian cuisine, traditional medicines, perfume, and religious rituals and offerings. Hybrids of citrons with other citrus are commercially more prominent, notably lemons and many limes.

Etymology 
The fruit's English name "citron" derives ultimately from Latin, citrus, which is also the origin of the genus name.

Other languages 
A source of confusion is that citron in French and English are false friends, as the French word refers to the lemon, while the English word is translated cédrat. Indeed, into the 16th century, the English name citron included the lemon and perhaps the lime as well. Other languages that use variants of citron to refer to the lemon include Armenian, Czech, Dutch, Finnish, German, Latvian, Lithuanian, Hungarian, Esperanto, Polish and the Scandinavian languages.

Similarly, in Latin, citrus, or thyine wood referred to the wood of a North African cypress, Tetraclinis articulata.
In Indo-Iranian languages, it is called , as against  ('bitter orange'). Both names were borrowed into Arabic and introduced into Spain and Portugal after their occupation by Muslims in AD 711, whence the latter became the source of the name orange through rebracketing (and the former of 'toronja' and 'toranja', which today describe the grapefruit in Spanish and Portuguese respectively).

Dutch merchants seasonally import Sukade for baked goods a thick light green commercially candied half peeling from Indonesia and other countries (sukade - Indonesian word for love, citrus médica variety macrocárpa) which can reach 2.5 kilograms mass. A bitter taste is removed by salt treatment before processing into confectionery.

In Hebrew it is called 'Etrog' (אתרוג).

Origin and distribution 

The citron is an old and original citrus species. In the 19th century it was widely grown in Northern Iran.

There is molecular evidence that most cultivated citrus species arose by hybridization of a small number of ancestral types, the citron, pomelo, mandarin and to a lesser extent, papedas and kumquat. The citron is usually fertilized by self-pollination, which results in their displaying a high degree of genetic homozygosity. It is the male parent of any citrus hybrid rather than a female one.

Archaeological evidence for citrus fruits has been limited, as neither seeds nor pollen are likely to be routinely recovered in archaeology. The citron is thought to have been native to India, in valleys at the foothills of the eastern Himalayas. It is thought that by the 4th century BC, when Theophrastus mentions the "Median apple", the citron was mostly cultivated in the Caspian Sea on its way to the Mediterranean basin, where it was cultivated during the later centuries in different areas as described by Erich Isaac. Many mention the role of Alexander the Great and his armies as they attacked Iran and what is today Pakistan, as being responsible for the spread of the citron westward, reaching the European countries such as Greece and Italy.

Antiquity 

Leviticus mentions the "fruit of the beautiful ('hadar') tree" as being required for ritual use during the Feast of Tabernacles (Lev. 23:40). According to Rabbinical tradition, the "fruit of the tree hadar" refers to the citron. Mishna Sukkah, c. 2nd century AD, deals with halakhic aspects of the citron.

The Egyptologist and archaeologist Victor Loret claimed to have identified it depicted on the walls of the botanical garden at the Karnak Temple, which dates back to the time of Thutmosis III, approximately 3,500 years ago. Citron was also cultivated in Sumer as early as the 3rd millennium BC.

The citron has been cultivated since ancient times, predating the cultivation of other citrus species.

Theophrastus 
The following description on citron was given by Theophrastus

In the east and south there are special plants... i.e. in Media and Persia there are many types of fruit, between them there is a fruit called Median or Persian Apple. The tree has a leaf similar to and almost identical with that of the andrachn (Arbutus andrachne L.), but has thorns like those of the apios (the wild pear, Pyrus amygdaliformis Vill.) or the firethorn (Cotoneaster pyracantha Spach.), except that they are white, smooth, sharp and strong. The fruit is not eaten, but is very fragrant, as is also the leaf of the tree; and the fruit is put among clothes, it keeps them from being moth-eaten. It is also useful when one has drunk deadly poison, for when it is administered in wine; it upsets the stomach and brings up the poison. It is also useful to improve the breath, for if one boils the inner part of the fruit in a dish or squeezes it into the mouth in some other medium, it makes the breath more pleasant.

The seed is removed from the fruit and sown in the spring in carefully tilled beds, and it is watered every fourth or fifth day. As soon the plant is strong it is transplanted, also in the spring, to a soft, well watered site, where the soil is not very fine, for it prefers such places.

And it bears its fruit at all seasons, for when some have gathered, the flower of the others is on the tree and is ripening others. Of the flowers I have said those that have a sort of distaff [meaning the pistil] projecting from the middle are fertile, while those that do not have this are sterile. It is also sown, like date palms, in pots punctured with holes.

This tree, as has been remarked, grows in Media and Persia.

Pliny the Elder 
Citron was also described by Pliny the Elder, who called it nata Assyria malus. The following is from his book Natural History:
There is another tree also with the same name of "citrus," and bears a fruit that is held by some persons in particular dislike for its smell and remarkable bitterness; while, on the other hand, there are some who esteem it very highly. This tree is used as an ornament to houses; it requires, however, no further description.

The citron tree, called the Assyrian, and by some the Median apple, is an antidote against poisons. The leaf is similar to that of the arbute, except that it has small prickles running across it. As to the fruit, it is never eaten, but it is remarkable for its extremely powerful smell, which is the case, also, with the leaves; indeed, the odour is so strong, that it will penetrate clothes, when they are once impregnated with it, and hence it is very useful in repelling the attacks of noxious insects.

The tree bears fruit at all seasons of the year; while some is falling off, other fruit is ripening, and other, again, just bursting into birth. Various nations have attempted to naturalize this tree among them, for the sake of its medical properties, by planting it in pots of clay, with holes drilled in them, for the purpose of introducing the air to the roots; and I would here remark, once for all, that it is as well to remember that the best plan is to pack all slips of trees that have to be carried to any distance, as close together as they can possibly be placed.

It has been found, however, that this tree will grow nowhere except in Media or Persia. It is this fruit, the pips of which, as we have already mentioned, the Parthian grandees employ in seasoning their ragouts, as being peculiarly conducive to the sweetening of the breath. We find no other tree very highly commended that is produced in Media.

Citrons, either the pulp of them or the pips, are taken in wine as an antidote to poisons. A decoction of citrons, or the juice extracted from them, is used as a gargle to impart sweetness to the breath. The pips of this fruit are recommended for pregnant women to chew when affected with qualmishness. Citrons are good, also, for a weak stomach, but it is not easy to eat them except with vinegar.

Medieval authors 
Ibn al-'Awwam's 12th-century agricultural encyclopedia, Book on Agriculture contains an article on citron tree cultivation in Spain.

Description and variation

Fruit 
The citron fruit is usually ovate or oblong, narrowing towards the stylar end. However, the citron's fruit shape is highly variable, due to the large quantity of albedo, which forms independently according to the fruits' position on the tree, twig orientation, and many other factors. The rind is leathery, furrowed, and adherent. The inner portion is thick, white and hard; the outer is uniformly thin and very fragrant. The pulp is usually acidic, but also can be sweet, and some varieties are entirely pulpless.

Most citron varieties contain a large number of monoembryonic seeds. The seeds are white with dark innercoats and red-purplish chalazal spots for the acidic varieties, and colorless for the sweet ones. Some citron varieties have persistent styles which do not fall off after fecundation. Those are usually preferred for ritual etrog use in Judaism.

Some citrons have medium-sized oil bubbles at the outer surface, medially distant to each other. Some varieties are ribbed and faintly warted on the outer surface. A fingered citron variety is commonly called Buddha's hand.

The color varies from green, when unripe, to a yellow-orange when overripe. The citron does not fall off the tree and can reach 8–10 pounds (4–5 kg) if not picked before fully mature. However, they should be picked before the winter, as the branches might bend or break to the ground, and may cause numerous fungal diseases for the tree.

Despite the wide variety of forms taken on by the fruit, citrons are all closely related genetically, representing a single species. Genetic analysis divides the known cultivars into three clusters: a Mediterranean cluster thought to have originated in India, and two clusters predominantly found in China, one representing the fingered citrons, and another consisting of non-fingered varieties.

Plant 

It has irregular straggling branches and stiff twigs and long spines at the leaf axils. The evergreen leaves are green and lemon-scented with slightly serrate edges, ovate-lanceolate or ovate elliptic 2.5 to 7.0 inches long. Petioles are usually wingless or with minor wings. The clustered flowers of the acidic varieties are purplish tinted from outside, but the sweet ones are white-yellowish.

The citron tree is very vigorous with almost no dormancy, blooming several times a year, and is therefore fragile and extremely sensitive to frost.

Varieties and hybrids 
The acidic varieties include the Florentine and Diamante citron from Italy, the Greek citron and the Balady citron from Israel. The sweet varieties include the Corsican and Moroccan citrons. The pulpless varieties also include some fingered varieties and the Yemenite citron.

There are also a number of citron hybrids; for example, ponderosa lemon, the lumia and rhobs el Arsa are known citron hybrids. Some claim that even the Florentine citron is not pure citron, but a citron hybrid.

Uses

Culinary 

While the lemon and orange are primarily peeled to consume their pulpy and juicy segments, the citron's pulp is dry, containing a small quantity of juice, if any. The main content of a citron fruit is its thick white rind, which adheres to the segments and cannot  easily be separated from them. The citron gets halved and depulped, then its rind (the thicker the better) is cut into pieces. Those are cooked in sugar syrup and used as a spoon sweet known in Greek as "kitro glyko" (κίτρο γλυκό), or diced and candied with sugar and used as a confection in cakes. In Italy, a soft drink called "Cedrata" is made from the fruit.

In Samoa a refreshing drink called "vai tipolo" is made from squeezed juice. It is also added to a raw fish dish called "oka" and to a variation of palusami or luáu.

Citron is a regularly used item in Asian cuisine.

Today the citron is also used for the fragrance or zest of its flavedo, but the most important part is still the inner rind (known as pith or albedo), which is a fairly important article in international trade and is widely employed in the food industry as succade, as it is known when it is candied in sugar.

The dozens of varieties of citron are collectively known as Lebu in Bangladesh, West Bengal, where it is the primary citrus fruit.

In Iran, the citron's thick white rind is used to make jam; in Pakistan the fruit is used to make jam but is also pickled; in South Indian cuisine, some varieties of citron (collectively referred to as "Narthangai" in Tamil and "Heralikayi" in Kannada) are widely used in pickles and preserves. In Karnataka, heralikayi (citron) is uses to make lemon rice. In Kutch, Gujarat, it is used to make pickle, wherein entire slices of fruits are salted, dried and mixed with jaggery and spices to make sweet spicy pickle. In the United States, citron is an important ingredient in holiday fruitcakes.

Folk medicine 
From ancient through medieval times, the citron was used mainly for supposed medical purposes to combat seasickness, scurvy and other disorders. The essential oil of the flavedo (the outermost, pigmented layer of rind) was also regarded as an antibiotic.

The juice of the citron has a high content of vitamin C and dietary fiber (pectin) which can be extracted from  the thick albedo of the citron.

Religious

In Judaism 

The citron (the word for which in Hebrew is etrog) is used by Jews for a religious ritual during the Jewish harvest holiday of Sukkot, the Feast of Tabernacles; therefore, it is considered to be a Jewish symbol, one found on various Hebrew antiques and archaeological findings.

In Buddhism 

A variety of citron native to China has sections that separate into finger-like parts and is used as an offering in Buddhist temples.

In Hinduism 
In Nepal, citron is worshipped during the Bhai Tika ceremony in Tihar festival.

Perfumery 
For many centuries, citron's fragrant essential oil (oil of cedrate) has been used in perfumery, the same oil that was used medicinally for its antibiotic properties. Its major constituent is limonene.

See also 
 Archaeological finds of citrons in Israel
 Gallery of Etrog citrons
 Gallery of Fingered citrons
 Candied Fruit Peel

Gallery

Citations

Further reading 
 H. Harold Hume, Citrus Fruits and Their Culture
 Frederick J. Simoons, Food in China: A Cultural and Historical Inquiry
 Pinhas Spiegel-Roy, Eliezer E. Goldschmidt, Biology of Citrus
 Alphonse de Candolle, Origin of Cultivated Plants

External links 

 USDA Plants Profile – Citrus medica 
 "Citron" Purdue University
  University of California- "Citrus Diversity"
Buddha's Hand citron by David Karp (pomologist)

 
Citrus
Essential oils
False friends
Four species (Sukkot)
Fruit trees
Fruits originating in Asia
Garden plants of Asia
Medicinal plants of Asia
Ornamental trees
Perfumes
Sukkot